Patrick Mutesa Mafisango (9 March 1980 – 17 May 2012) was a Rwandan international footballer who played as a midfielder.

Career
Born in Kinshasa, Zaire, Mafisango played club football in the Congo, Rwanda and Tanzania for TP Mazembe, APR, ATRACO, Azam and Simba. He won the 2011–12 Tanzanian Premier League title with Simba, after joining from rivals Azam in May 2011.

He earned 23 caps at senior international level for Rwanda, scoring twice, between 2006 and 2011. He also appeared in ten FIFA World Cup qualifying matches.

Death
He died on the way to hospital after being involved a car crash on 17 May 2012.

Honours 

Simba
 Ligi kuu Bara: 2011–12

References

1980 births
2012 deaths
Footballers from Kinshasa
Rwandan footballers
Rwanda international footballers
Simba S.C. players
Rwandan expatriate footballers
Expatriate footballers in Tanzania
Rwandan expatriate sportspeople in Tanzania
Road incident deaths in Tanzania
Azam F.C. players
Association football midfielders
ATRACO F.C. players
Tanzanian Premier League players